Hans Aarsman (born 1951) is a Dutch photographer, author, and lecturer at the Rijksakademie in Amsterdam. He is a significant figure in the New Topography movement. Many of Aarsman's works are in the Netherlands Photo Museum.

Life and work
Aarsman was born in 1951 in Amsterdam. He started his career as a photojournalist for the Dutch newspaper Trouw. In 1989 he published the book Hollandse Taferelen which consisted of landscapes photographed from the roof of a camper which he pulled through the Netherlands for a year. In 1990–1991 he finished a photo series of East German states.

He exhibited work at the Rencontres d'Arles festival in Arles, France in 2011.

Aarsman also is a novelist and playwright. His debut literary work was Twee hoofden, een kussen (1995) and more recently he has been dedicating himself more to writing than photography.

Publications

Photography
Hollandse Taferelen (1989)
Aarsmans Amsterdam (1993)
Een engeltje dat over mijn tong piest (1995)
Vrrooom! Vrrooom! (2003)

Literature
Twee hoofden, een kussen (1995)

References

External links

Aarsman giving a talk at TEDxAmsterdam in 2009 (video)

1951 births
Living people
Photographers from Amsterdam
Writers from Amsterdam
20th-century Dutch novelists
20th-century Dutch male writers
20th-century Dutch dramatists and playwrights
21st-century Dutch novelists
21st-century Dutch male writers
21st-century Dutch dramatists and playwrights
Dutch male novelists
Dutch male dramatists and playwrights